The 1978 Copa Libertadores Finals was the final two-legged tie to determine the 1978 Copa Libertadores champion. It was contested by Argentine club Boca Juniors (which had entered directly to semifinals as 1977 champion) and Colombian club Deportivo Cali. The first leg of the tie was played on November 23 at Deportivo Cali' home field, with the second leg played on November 28 at Boca Juniors'. It was Deportivo Cali 1st Copa Libertadores finals and 3rd finals for Boca Juniors.

Boca Juniors won the series after winning the second leg tie 4-0 at Buenos Aires's La Bombonera and accumulated more points than their opponent.

Qualified teams

Rules
The finals will be played over two legs; home and away. The team that accumulates the most points —two for a win, one for a draw, zero for a loss— after the two legs will be crowned the champion. If the two teams are tied on points after the second leg, a playoff in a neutral venue will become the next tie-breaker. Goal difference is going to be used as a last resort.

Venues

Road to the final

Note: In all results below, the score of the finalist is given first (H: home; A: away).

Match details

First leg

Second leg

References

1978 in South American football
Copa Libertadores Finals
l
Deportivo Cali matches
Copa
Copa
1978